General John Reed Hodge (June 12, 1893 – November 12, 1963) was a highly decorated senior officer of the United States Army. His final assignment before retiring was as Chief of Army Field Forces from 1952 to 1953.

Early life and career
Born in Golconda, Illinois, Hodge attended Southern Illinois Teachers College and the University of Illinois. After completing an officer indoctrination program at the U.S. Army Officer Candidate School at Fort Sheridan, he received a direct commission in the Army as an infantry second lieutenant in 1917. He served in World War I in France and Luxembourg.

Between the wars
Remaining in the Army following the end of the war, he taught military science at Mississippi State University from 1921 to 1925 and graduated from the Infantry School in 1926. After a posting to Hawaii, he graduated from the Command and General Staff School, the Army War College, and the Air Corps Tactical School.

World War II

At the beginning of World War II, Hodge served as chief of staff of the VII Corps under the command of Major General Robert C. Richardson Jr., located in California as a part of the Western Defense Command. He was promoted to the temporary rank of brigadier general in June 1942 and transferred to the 25th Infantry Division in Hawaii, where he was appointed assistant division commander and deputy of Major General J. Lawton Collins.

The 25th Division was sent overseas to Guadalcanal in November 1942. Hodge stayed with 25th Division until April 1943, when he was promoted to the rank of major general and transferred to the temporary command of the 43rd Infantry Division, where he relieved Major General John H. Hester, who was exhausted from combat. Hodge commanded the 43rd Division during the combats in Northern Solomons and was decorated with the Army Distinguished Service Medal for his service.

After three months of service with 43rd Division, Hodge was given command of the "Americal" Infantry Division on the Fiji Islands. He subsequently commanded the Americal Division during the Bougainville campaign.

Hodge was appointed commanding officer of the newly activated XXIV Corps in Hawaii and participated in the Battle of Leyte within Philippines Campaign and later in Battle of Okinawa. He received Army Distinguished Service Medals for each of these campaigns. Hodge was promoted to the temporary rank of lieutenant general in June 1945.

Later career

From 1945 to 1948, Hodge was the commanding general of United States Army Forces in Korea (USAFIK). He took his corps to Korea under orders of General MacArthur, landing at Incheon on 9 September 1945. He was the commanding officer receiving the surrender of all Japanese forces in Korea south of the 38th parallel.

Hodge then returned to Fort Bragg, North Carolina, to command V US Corps from 1948 to 1950. After the outbreak of the Korean War in 1950, he was named the commanding general of the US Third Army, based in the United States of America, and not in Korea.

Hodge was promoted to general on 5 July 1952.  His final assignment was as Chief of Army Field Forces from 8 May 1952 until he retired from military service on June 30, 1953.  

General Hodge died in Washington, D.C., in 1963.

Decorations

Dates of rank

See also

 History of South Korea
 Military history of the United States
 Jang Il-soon, who opposed Hodge's appointment to lead the United States Army Military Government in Korea

References

External links
Generals of World War II
United States Army Officers 1939–1945

1893 births
1963 deaths
United States Army Infantry Branch personnel
People from Golconda, Illinois
Military personnel from Illinois
University of Illinois alumni
Southern Illinois University alumni
Air Corps Tactical School alumni
United States Army Command and General Staff College alumni
United States Army War College alumni
United States Army personnel of World War I
Korea–United States relations
Recipients of the Distinguished Service Medal (US Army)
Recipients of the Navy Distinguished Service Medal
Recipients of the Legion of Merit
Recipients of the Air Medal
Burials at Arlington National Cemetery
United States Army generals of World War II
United States Army generals
Mississippi State University faculty